Puerto Rico participated at the 2018 Summer Youth Olympics in Buenos Aires, Argentina from 6 October to 18 October 2018.

Medalists

Athletics (track and field)

Beach volleyball

Puerto Rico qualified a boys' and girls' team based on their performance at the 2018 Central Zone U19 Championship.

 Boys' tournament – Randall Santiago and William Rivera
 Girls' tournament – Allanis Navas and María González

Boxing

Boys

Fencing

Puerto Rico qualified one athlete based on its performance at the 2018 Cadet World Championship.

 Boys' Sabre – Hudson Santana

Gymnastics

Acrobatic
Puerto Rico qualified a mixed pair based on its performance at the 2018 Acrobatic Gymnastics World Championship.

 Mixed pair – Adriel Gónzalez and Daniela González

Artistic
Puerto Rico qualified two gymnasts based on its performance at the 2018 American Junior Championship.

 Boys' artistic individual all-around – Michael Torres
 Girls' artistic individual all-around – Kryxia Alicea

Judo

Individual

Team

Karate

Puerto Rico qualified one athlete based on its performance at one of the Karate Qualification Tournaments.

 Girls' +59kg – Janessa Fonseca

Swimming

Table tennis

Puerto Rico qualified one table tennis player based on its performance at the Latin American Continental Qualifier.

 Girls' singles – Adriana Díaz

Weightlifting

Boy

Girl

References

2018 in Puerto Rican sports
Nations at the 2018 Summer Youth Olympics
Puerto Rico at the Youth Olympics